"Dangerous" is a hip hop song written by Lawrence Dermer, Trevor Smith, Rashad Smith, Henry Stone and Freddy Stonewall for Busta Rhymes second album When Disaster Strikes. The song is the album's fifteenth track, and was released as its second single, peaking at #9 on the Billboard Hot 100. It was nominated for the Grammy Award for Best Rap Solo Performance at the 41st Grammy Awards in 1999, but lost to "Gettin' Jiggy wit It" by Will Smith. The video was directed by Hype Williams.

Music and lyrics
"Dangerous" has a rhythm tempo at 103 BPM.
The chorus of the song (This is serious/We could make you delirious/You should have a healthy fear of us/'Cause too much of us is dangerous) was taken from a 1980s PSA produced by Kids Corner Ltd of Colorado Springs, Colorado that warned children about the danger of loose prescription medications.
The rhythm track was sampled from the 1982 song "E.T. Boogie" by the Extra T's.

Music video
The video takes several cues from Lethal Weapon with Busta made to look like Mel Gibson (Riggs) and Spliff Star to look like Gary Busey (Mr. Joshua). The second verse also references the scene where Riggs is electrocuted, and ends with a confrontation between Busta and himself, this time dressed as Sho'nuff from The Last Dragon.

Formats and track listings
These are the formats and track listings of major single releases of "Dangerous".
CD single
"Dangerous" (album version)
"Dangerous" (instrumental)
"Dangerous" (a cappella)
"You Won't Tell, I Won't Tell" (unavailable on album)
"Coming Off" (unavailable on album)
"You Won't Tell, I Won't Tell" (instrumental)
"Coming Off" (instrumental)

UK CD single
"Dangerous" (album version)
"Dangerous" (Soul Society remix)
"Dangerous" (album dirty version)
"Dangerous" (Natural Born Chillers remix)

Credits and personnel
Vocals: Busta Rhymes, Rachelle Weston
Audio mixing: Dominick Barbera, Busta Rhymes, DJ Scratch, Vinny Nicoletti
Mixing assistant: Rich Tapper, Floyd Nixon
Engineer: Vinny Nicoletti
Assistant engineers: Tom Passetti, Dave Raythatha

Charts and certifications

Weekly charts

Year-end charts

Certifications

|}

References

External links
Busta Rhymes' Official Website

1997 singles
1997 songs
Busta Rhymes songs
Elektra Records singles
Music videos directed by Hype Williams
Songs written by Busta Rhymes
Songs written by Rashad Smith
Songs written by Lawrence Dermer